NYC Health + Hospitals/North Central Bronx, better known as North Central Bronx Hospital, is a municipal hospital founded in 1976 and  operated by NYC Health + Hospitals. The 17 story Brutalist style building is located next to the Montefiore Medical Center in the Norwood neighborhood of The Bronx in New York City.

North Central Bronx Hospital is one of the 11 acute care hospitals of the NYC Health + Hospitals corporation. The hospital is a partner in the North Bronx Healthcare Network along with the Jacobi Medical Center.

The hospital has an educational affiliation with James J. Peters VA Medical Center.

History 
The $100 million Brutalist architecture facility opened on October 25, 1976. A $12.5 million a year contract with nearby Montefiore Medical Center to provide some medical services was in place at the time.

In 1977 the hospital began a birth center program that includes midwives.
 The birth center was renovated in 2013 and re-opened in 2014.

In 2020, the 215 bed hospital began a rapid expansion of 120 additional intensive care unit (ICU) beds to assist the hospital's response to the COVID-19 pandemic. The first 20 of the additional beds were opened as a COVID-19 specific ICU on May 5, 2020.

See also 
 NYC Health + Hospitals
 Montefiore Medical Center
 List of hospitals in the Bronx

References

External links 
 nycservice.org
 ProPublica web page on North Central Bronx Hospitals' emergency room

Hospitals in the Bronx
Teaching hospitals in New York City

1976 establishments in New York City

Hospital buildings completed in 1976
Hospitals established in 1976
Norwood, Bronx
NYC Health + Hospitals
Brutalist architecture in New York City
Public hospitals in the United States